The men's team sabre competition at the 2018 Asian Games in Jakarta was held on 23 August at the Jakarta Convention Center. South Korea team defend the men's team sabre title and captured the gold medal after beat Iranian team 45–32 in the final. The Iranian team is entitled to a silver medal, while the bronze medal won by Chinese and Hong Kong team.

Schedule
All times are Western Indonesia Time (UTC+07:00)

Seeding
The teams were seeded taking into account the results achieved by competitors representing each team in the individual event.

Results

Final standing

References

Results

External links
Fencing at the 2018 Asian Games - Men's team sabre

Men's sabre team